The following is a list of California Golden Bears football seasons for the football team that has represented University of California, Berkeley in NCAA competition.

Seasons

Rugby 
Cal played rugby in various years instead of football and includes these rugby seasons within their football results with callout notes.

Notes

References 

 
Lists of college football seasons
University of California-related lists
California Golden Bears football seasons